Erica P. John Fund, Inc. v. Halliburton Co., 563 U.S. 804 (2011), was a United States Supreme Court case in which the Court held that "securities fraud plaintiffs need not prove loss causation in order to obtain class certification." Their decision cleared the way for class action to proceed against Halliburton over its alleged misrepresentation of facts material to the value of its stock price.

Aftermath
On remand, the United States District Court for the Northern District of Texas held that Halliburton had discharged its burden of proof that alleged corrective disclosures had not resulted in any price impact for five, but not a sixth, corrective disclosure. Accordingly, a class action has been certified for the last instance.

The Court now allows defendants "to present evidence before a class is certified showing that the alleged fraud had no effect on the price" movements." Securities class action litigation will face additional hurdles and may be curbed, but not eliminated as result. with further restriction of law being dependent on the United States Congress.

A further attempt by Halliburton to defeat class action was taken at the Court of Appeal in April 2013, and once again defeated. Undeterred Halliburton again petitioned the Supreme Court to reconsider this position. At stake was "one of the fundamental tenets of securities fraud litigation: a doctrine known as fraud on the market.” If this theory were unavailable, issues of individual shareholders' reliance would overshadow the common issues, and the class would not be eligible for certification under Rule 23 of the Federal Rules of Civil Procedure.

On June 23, 2014, the Supreme Court affirmed the reasoning of Basic Inc. v. Levinson, saying that it was not espousing any particular theory of markets, only the presumption that false statements can affect the price:

Further reading

See also 
 List of United States Supreme Court cases, volume 563

References

External links
 

2011 in United States case law
2014 in United States case law
United States Supreme Court cases of the Roberts Court
United States Supreme Court cases
Halliburton